The Cherio is a river of the Province of Bergamo in Lombardy in Italy.
Monte Torrezzo near Lake Endine. From there, it flows into the Oglio at Palosco. The main tributary is the Tadone River on its right bank.

The valley of the river is known as the Val Cavallina (lit. "Valley of the Little Horse"). The river flows past the communes of Endine Gaiano, Monasterolo del Castello, Casazza, Vigano San Martino, Grone, Borgo di Terzo, Berzo San Fermo, Luzzana, Entratico, Trescore Balneario, Zandobbio, Gorlago, Carobbio degli Angeli, Bolgare, Calcinate, Mornico al Serio and Palosco.

References

Rivers of the Province of Bergamo
Rivers of Italy